Liselott Blixt (born 22 February 1965 in Lund) is a Swedish-Danish politician, who is a member of the Folketing for the Danish People's Party. She was elected into the Folketing in the 2007 Danish general election.

Political career
Blixt has been a part of the municipal council of Greve Municipality since the 2001 Danish local elections. Since 2014 she has also been the deputy mayor of the municipality.

Blixt first ran for parliament in the 2007 election, and was elected with just 959 personal votes cast for her. She was reelected in 2011 with 1,306 votes, in 2015 with 5,981 votes and in 2019 with 2,427 votes.

External links 
 Biography on the website of the Danish Parliament (Folketinget)

References 

Living people
1965 births
People from Lund
21st-century Danish women politicians
Women members of the Folketing
Danish People's Party politicians
Danish municipal councillors
Members of the Folketing 2007–2011
Members of the Folketing 2011–2015
Members of the Folketing 2015–2019
Members of the Folketing 2019–2022